Laura Ashe is a British historian of English medieval literature, history and culture (c. 1000–1550). She lectures in English and is a Fellow of Worcester College, Oxford. She was educated at Leeds Girls' High School (independent).

In 2009 Ashe won a Philip Leverhulme Prize, for the international impact of her research. In 2015 she was the presenter for BBC Radio 3's A Cultural History of the Plague and has taken part as an expert panelist for BBC Radio 4's In Our Time on the topics of The 12th Century Renaissance, Beowulf, Chivalry Le Morte d'Arthur, Purgatory, Thomas Becket and Gawain and the Green Knight. She contributed to Art that Made Us, an eight-part BBC Two TV series in 2022 presenting an alternate history of Britain through art and literature.

Selected publications

References 

British medievalists
British women historians
English literary historians
Fellows of Worcester College, Oxford
Historians of English literature
Living people
Women literary historians
Women medievalists
Year of birth missing (living people)